Mastigias is a genus of true jellyfish in the family Mastigiidae. It contains seven described species. Members of this genus are found widely in coastal regions of the Indo-Pacific, including saline lakes of Palau (e.g., Jellyfish Lake), but there are also records from the West Atlantic at Florida and Puerto Rico. The West Atlantic records are most likely the result of accidental introductions by humans.

Species
According to the World Register of Marine Species, this genus includes seven species:
 Mastigias albipunctatus 
 Mastigias andersoni 
 Mastigias gracilis 
 Mastigias ocellatus  – golden medusa
 Mastigias pantherinus 
 Mastigias papua – spotted jelly
 Mastigias siderea

Synapomorphies 
For reproduction, Mastigias pupua has adopted a mono-mode reproductive strategy that develops only free-swimming buds. Mastigias organisms also are able to produce swimming frustules, a hard and porous cell wall covering diatoms.

Habitat 
The genus Mastigias is native to the western and central Indo-Pacific, from Australia to Japan, and Micronesia to the Indian Ocean. However, most Mastigias organisms choose to live in landlocked marine lakes. Behavioral differences among this genus do occur with varying habitats. Marine lake Mastigias' swim slower than their oceanic ancestors. The Mastigias genus may have to adapt to a habitat with warmer temperatures. With growing temperature deviation above the average, organisms within this genus have seen a decrease in population as well as growing mortality rates.

Interactions 

Mastigias jellyfish have a symbiotic relationship with zooxanthellae living in host gastrodermal cells where they exhibit phased division. The Mastigias genus of jellyfish symbiotically produce ephyrae only in the presence of Symbiodinium, in a process called strobilation.

References

Mastigiidae
Scyphozoan genera